Amhara may refer to:
 Amhara people, an ethnic group of Ethiopia
 Amharic, a language spoken by the Amhara people
 Bete Amhara, a lordship and later province of medieval Ethiopia
 Amhara Province, a historical region of Ethiopia
 Amhara Region, an administrative region of modern Ethiopia
 Amhara, Bihar, India
 Amhara, a subdivision of the former Italian East Africa

See also
 Amara (disambiguation)
 Amroha, Uttar Pradesh, India

Language and nationality disambiguation pages